Oneida Township is a township in Huntingdon County, Pennsylvania, United States. The population was 1,077 at the 2010 census.  The township includes the villages of Donation, Center Union, and Cold Springs.

Geography
According to the United States Census Bureau, the township has a total area of 17.6 square miles (45.7 km2), of which 17.6 square miles (45.6 km2)  is land and 0.04 square mile (0.1 km2)  (0.17%) is water.

Municipal Building
Oneida Township Municipal Building9784 Standing Stone Rd, Huntingdon, PA 16652

Adjacent municipalities
All municipalities are located in Huntingdon County unless otherwise noted.
Huntingdon borough
Henderson Township
Miller Township
Barree Township
West Township
Logan Township
Porter Township
Smithfield Township

Demographics

As of the census of 2000, there were 1,129 people, 466 households, and 358 families residing in the township.  The population density was 64.1 people per square mile (24.7/km2).  There were 511 housing units at an average density of 29.0/sq mi (11.2/km2).  The racial makeup of the township was 98.32% White, 0.71% African American, 0.09% Native American, 0.80% Asian, and 0.09% from two or more races. Hispanic or Latino of any race were 0.09% of the population.

There were 466 households, out of which 28.8% had children under the age of 18 living with them, 66.3% were married couples living together, 7.5% had a female householder with no husband present, and 23.0% were non-families. 19.7% of all households were made up of individuals, and 7.9% had someone living alone who was 65 years of age or older.  The average household size was 2.42 and the average family size was 2.78.

In the township the population was spread out, with 22.1% under the age of 18, 5.0% from 18 to 24, 26.4% from 25 to 44, 29.2% from 45 to 64, and 17.4% who were 65 years of age or older.  The median age was 44 years. For every 100 females there were 98.1 males.  For every 100 females age 18 and over, there were 96.4 males.

The median income for a household in the township was $41,438, and the median income for a family was $45,284. Males had a median income of $37,614 versus $25,208 for females. The per capita income for the township was $19,729.  About 3.5% of families and 7.9% of the population were below the poverty line, including 14.5% of those under age 18 and 6.6% of those age 65 or over.

References

Townships in Huntingdon County, Pennsylvania
Townships in Pennsylvania